SMPP may refer to:

 Short Message Peer-to-Peer, a telecommunications protocol
 Stupino Machine Production Plant, a company based in Stupino, Russia